This is a list of museums in the province of Cádiz. According to the Ministry of Culture, there are 22 museums in the province of Cádiz.

Museums in the province of Cádiz

See also 
 List of museums in Andalusia
 List of museums in Málaga
 List of museums in Spain
 Province of Cádiz

References

External links 
 2010 Official guide of museums in Andalusia 
 Museums in Jerez de la Frontera

Province of Cádiz
.Cádiz
Cadiz